Speed Crazy is a psychobilly band from New Jersey. Members are Greg Bury on guitar and vocals, Erica Martinez on upright bass and vocals, and Jeremy Kroger on drums. The band has been playing on the psychobilly scene for over 11 years, Greg has played in other international rockabilly bands such as Andy and his Poor Boys and Jet Black Machine.

Speed Crazy also has record distribution throughout the USA, Brasil, Puerto Rico, UK and Japan.

Notable gigs include the Drop Dead Festival NYC, Wreckers Ball in L.A., Hollywood Rumble, Heavy Rebel Weekender in Winston-Salem NC, Sleazefest in Chapel Hill, NC, Raucous Records London Psycho Weekender in the U.K. and North by Northeast in Toronto. Speed Crazy's venues in the NYC tri-state area include CBGB's, Knitting Factory, and Asbury Lanes.

Discography
 Trouble Comes in Threes, 2006
 Tales From the Train Wreck, 2006 
 Chicken Fried Valentine, 2002
 Love Kills, 2000
 Unsafe at Any Speed, 1999
 Speed Crazy, 1997

External links
official site
myspace page

American psychobilly musical groups
Musical groups from New Jersey
Country musicians from New Jersey